The former St. George Roman Catholic Church is located at 823 Climax Street in the Allentown neighborhood of Pittsburgh, Pennsylvania. The church was designed by Herman J. Lang in the German Romanesque and Rundbogenstil architectural styles, was built in 1910-1912, and today functions as a community space.

History 
The St. George Parish was formed as one of several outgrowths of the St. Michael Parish on the Southside in 1886. St. Michael was one of the oldest German Catholic parishes located in Allegheny County and over five parishes grew from it. The new parish needed a location and they chose one in the Pittsburgh neighborhood of Allentown. Allentown was central to German-American immigrant life in Pittsburgh, and at certain points Germans were among the largest ethnic groups to settle in the area. In the late 19th century the area was also open and undeveloped, becoming home to a more well off sect of businessmen and artisans. The area was annexed into the City of Pittsburgh in 1872, just shortly before the formation of St. George Parish. 

Immediately after the Parish's formation they purchased a plot of land directly at the center of Allentown for $7 thousand. The construction of the first St. George's church took place in September of that same year of inception. In the period of 1886 to 1910 the church's congregation grew significantly. This growth required and allowed the church to buy more land, to build a parochial school, to establish a convent, and to build a rectory.

By 1910 it was clear that the original church building was insufficient for the new, larger congregation's needs, and the decision to build a new church was made. The parish hired Herman J. Lang, of the firm Edmund B. Lang & Brother, as their architect. His selection was significant due to his German heritage. German immigrants tended to huddle in strong ethnic communities and neighborhoods so that they could preserve their customs and traditions. Churches were considered to be the focal point of these German communities, and they felt as though Protestants did not understand their needs. They thus decided to choose architects who practiced their religion and understood their customs, rather than Irish, American, or English-born designers. Lang's selection, despite his being relatively unknown at the time, is representative of this trend.

The construction for the new church began in 1910 and was formally completed in July 1912. Since then it was renamed to St. John Vianney Roman Catholic Church, and was deconsecrated by decree in 2016. It now serves as a community space. The church was nominated in January 2016 to become a City Historic Landmark by Preservation Pittsburgh.

Architecture 
Architect Herman Lang designed the church in the German Romanesque architectural style, an American derivative of the Rundbogenstil style. German emigrants brought the style to popularity within the United States as Greek Revival, Italianate, and other popular styles of the time were not designed for German ethnic expression. The former St. George Church exemplifies this trend well with its grand basilica resembling German cathedrals in Europe. The stained glass windows (notably the Tu Es Petrus and St. George and the Dragon Stained Glass Windows) also served as beacons for the church's identity in addition to its other German architectural styling. The church's architecture was meant to display its German connections, and it did this effectively.

References 

Roman Catholic churches in Pittsburgh
Roman Catholic churches completed in 1912
Former Roman Catholic church buildings in Pennsylvania
20th-century Roman Catholic church buildings in the United States